Live & More is a live album by Marcus Miller released in 1998.

Reception
Allmusic awarded the album with 4.5 stars and its review by Jonathan Widran states: "While Miller plays everything but the kitchen sink himself (bass, bass clarinet, guitar, and vocoder), the genuine excitement here emerges from giving space to and interacting and stretching out with his sea of all-stars."

Track listing
All tracks composed by Marcus Miller; except where noted.
"Intro" – 2:26
"Panther" – 9:06
"Tutu" – 10:59
"Funny (All She Needs Is Love)" – 12:42 (Marcus Miller, Boz Scaggs)
"Strange Fruit" – 3:56 (Lewis Allan)
"Summertime" – 5:33 (Ira Gershwin, George Gershwin, DuBose Heyward)
"Maputo" – 8:17
"People Make The World Go 'Round" – 9:04 (Thom Bell, Linda Creed)
"Sophie" – 4:53
"Jazz In The House" – 5:46

Personnel
Marcus Miller – bass, bass clarinet, guitar, keyboards, soprano saxophone, vocals, vocoder
Hiram Bullock – guitar
David Delhomme – keyboards, guitar
Dean Brown – guitar	
Bernard Wright – keyboards	
Lalah Hathaway – vocals
Kenny Garrett  – alto saxophone, soprano saxophone
Everette Harp – tenor saxophone
Roger Byam – tenor saxophone
Michael "Patches" Stewart – trumpet		
David "E-Man" Ward – additional keyboards, guitar, percussion, sound design	
Poogie Bell  – drums
Lenny White - additional drums
Drew Zingg - additional guitar

References

External links
Official Marcus Miller site
All About Jazz's Review by Christopher Hoard

Marcus Miller albums
1997 live albums
Albums produced by Marcus Miller
GRP Records live albums